FK Korzo was a football club based in the city of Prilep, North Macedonia. They recently played in the Macedonian Second League.

History
The club was founded in 1972.

FK Korzo is short for the Prilep settlement Staro Korzo. The club was re-established in the summer of 2007. It went up two tiers in just two years and after winning the Regional A and B Leagues they qualified for the Macedonian Third League. In June 2012 after beating the guest Vardar Negotino with 5–1 Korzo qualified for the Macedonian Second League.

In July 2013 FK Korzo announced that the club merged with KF Shkupi, and was the club dissolved.

External links 

Club info at MacedonianFootball 
Club info at MakFudbal 
Football Federation of Macedonia 

Defunct football clubs in North Macedonia
Association football clubs established in 1972
Association football clubs disestablished in 2013
1972 establishments in the Socialist Republic of Macedonia
2013 disestablishments in the Republic of Macedonia
Football clubs in Prilep